Ke Shaomin (1850–1933), courtesy name Fengsun, also known by his art name Liaoyuan, was a Chinese historian from Jiaozhou, Shandong. He is most known for writing the New History of Yuan, one of the Twenty-Five Histories, and helping to lead the compilation of the Draft History of Qing. He was a secretary in the Qing dynasty court in its final years.

References 

1850 births
1933 deaths
Qing dynasty historians
19th-century Chinese historians
People from Jiaozhou City
Writers from Qingdao